The Kern Front Oil Field is a large oil and gas field in the lower Sierra Nevada foothills in Kern County, California. It is adjacent to the much larger Kern River Oil Field, which is to the southeast, and the Mount Poso Oil Field to the north.

Setting

The field is spread out, especially compared to the exceedingly dense development in the adjacent Kern River Oil Field, which has one of the densest oil developments in the United States, with over 9,000 oil wells clustered in just several square miles. The Kern Front Field is bounded on the west by California State Route 65, on the southwest by James Road, and on the southeast by Bakersfield-Glennville Road. Oilfields Road runs south to north through the field.

The climate is hot and arid, with summertime temperatures routinely exceeding ; the mean freeze-free period runs from about 250 to 300 days.

Geology

The Kern Front Field contains two major producing units, the Etchegoin Formation  and the Chanac, both sedimentary, but unconformably overlain.  The Etchegoin is a Pliocene marine sand, and the Chanac is a Pliocene non-marine sand.  Each is interbedded with silts and clays, and the sands have a high porosity, ranging from 25-33 percent, making them singularly suitable as petroleum reservoirs.  Overlying the Etchegoin and Chanac formations is the Pleistocene Kern River Formation, which is highly productive in the adjacent Kern River Oil Field.  These units all have a northwest strike and a small southwest dip.  A large north-trending fault on the east side of the field provides a structural seal on that side; on the northeast, the up-dip side of the field, the sands grade into relatively impermeable silts and clays, providing a seal in that direction.  Many small southwest-trending faults run across the field.  The California DOGGR recognizes only one producing pool – the Etchegoin-Chanac – and commingles the production data.

Many sedimentary units underlie these petroleum-bearing sands, but they either have not produced much oil or have not been completely explored. The deepest well on the Kern Front Field, the Atlantic Richfield Company "Kramer No. 1", reached a depth of  before bumping into the basement complex.

Oil from the field is heavy crude, with an API gravity averaging 14, and a sulfur content of 0.9 percent by weight.  Since this oil is heavy, it is viscous and flows easily only when assisted by steam injection or other enhanced recovery techniques.

History, production, and operations
The well still exists, as Chevron Corp. Well No. 1.

Production steadily declined from that peak until the invention of the steam injection method in the 1960s.  Cyclic steam injection (the "huff and puff method" began in 1964, and production again rose, as the heavy oil flowed more freely to pumping wells.  In 1978, former operator Chevron Corp. began steam flooding in the southern portion of the field, and Century Oil Management did the same in the northern portion.  Petro-Lewis Corporation tested steam foam solution and a steam foam encapsulated in a polymer gel to see if steamflood performance could be improved. 

Gas production on the field peaked in 1980.

This estimate is based on work done by the operators of the field in 1990, Mobil, ARCO and Occidental, and involves both recovering previously uneconomic deposits, as well as exploring deeper, previously unexplored zones, which some of the geologists believed may be petroleum-bearing.

As of the beginning of 2009, there were 838 producing oil wells on the field.  If some of the current proposals for further exploration and development are enacted, such as those by Tearlach, this number could increase considerably.

Current operators include Bellaire, Vintage, E&B Natural Resource Management, West American Energy Corp., and a few others.  The field operators deliver some wastewater from oil production to Valley Waste Disposal, with some wastewater being filtered and softened to make feedwater for steam boilers.  Valley Waste skims residual oil and grease from the water, and the water is conveyed to Cawelo Water District, where it is re-used for irrigation.

References
 California Oil and Gas Fields, Volumes I, II and III. Vol. I (1998), Vol. II (1992), Vol. III (1982). California Department of Conservation, Division of Oil, Gas, and Geothermal Resources (DOGGR). 1,472 pp. McKittrick Oil Field information pp. 268-272. PDF file available on CD from www.consrv.ca.gov.
 California Department of Conservation, Oil and Gas Statistics, Annual Report, December 31, 2006.
 Bellaire Oil Company:  description of geology, production, and operations at the Kern Front Field

Notes

Oil fields in Kern County, California
Oil fields in California